Zeche Bochum is a live music venue located in Bochum, Germany. It opened in 1981 and has hosted notable artists such as Tina Turner, R.E.M., Duran Duran, Poppy and Depeche Mode.

References

External links
 Official website 

Music venues in Germany
1981 establishments in West Germany